Kelly Garrett (March 25, 1944 – August 7, 2013) was an American actress and singer known for her work on the Broadway stage and on television. She was nominated for a Tony Award in 1976 for Best Featured Actress in a Musical.

Personal life and career
Born Ellen Boulton to  Sabina (née Griego), a nurse, and Jack Boulton (1916–1987), a marine. The family moved to Santa Fe, New Mexico where Garrett attended Catholic schools and began singing. She attended Cincinnati Conservatory of Music, later moving Los Angeles and then Las Vegas doing singing gigs at supper clubs. She then started performing on television series such as Shindig! and The Johnny Carson Show. Around this time in the 1960s, Garrett also began a short-lived recording career. In the 1970s, she moved to New York City. Her stage name is often confused with the popular character also named "Kelly Garrett" on Charlie's Angels. In 1976 she performed at the Academy Awards singing "Richard's Window" from The Other Side of the Mountain, which was nominated for Best Song.

Broadway
Garrett made her Broadway debut in the 1972 musical Mother Earth, for which she received a Theatre World award. In 1974 she performed in the musical revue Words & Music. In 1975 she performed in the musical revue The Night That Made America Famous, for which she was nominated for the first Drama Desk Award for Outstanding Featured Actress in a Musical and she was also nominated for the Tony Award. She was considered for the lead role of Mabel in Mack & Mabel, losing  the role to Bernadette Peters.

Death
Garrett died on August 7, 2013, in an Albuquerque, New Mexico hospice at the age of 69 from complications of throat and tongue cancer. She had been living in Rio Rancho, New Mexico, retired from performing, and was working as an arts educator and coach. Garrett did not have children and was once divorced. She is survived by her mother Sabina, who had remarried after her father's death to Nazario C. de Baca (1916–2013) and eight siblings. Her father and sister Alice preceded her in death, her nephew Kevin died on May 21, 2014. Her ashes were scattered near the former Pecos River home of her grandparents.

References

External links
 
 

1944 births
American stage actresses
2013 deaths
Actresses from New Mexico
21st-century American women